Chimaltenango is a department of Guatemala. The capital is Chimaltenango.

Geography
Located to the east are Guatemala Department, home to Guatemala City, and Sacatepéquez Department, while also bordered by Quiché Department and Baja Verapaz Department to the north, Escuintla Department and Suchitepéquez Department to the south, and Sololá Department to the west. The capital of Chimaltenango is located about 54 kilometers away from Guatemala City.

In addition to the city of Chimaltenango, the department contains the towns of Santa Apolonia (known for its ceramics), San Juan Comalapa, and Patzún (known for its elaborate Corpus Christi celebrations in June). Chimaltenango is also home to the Maya civilization ruins of Iximché and Mixco Viejo, in addition to many smaller sites.

Demographics
As of the 2018 census, the population of Chimaltenango department was 615,776. The majority of the people in the department are of Cakchiquel Maya descent.  The department has an area of 1,979 km².

There are several humanitarian aid groups that provide services in Chimaltenango.

Municipalities

 Acatenango
 Chimaltenango
 El Tejar
 Parramos
 Patzicía
 Patzún
 Pochuta
 San Andrés Itzapa
 San José Poaquil
 San Juan Comalapa
 San Martín Jilotepeque
 Santa Apolonia
 Santa Cruz Balanyá
 Tecpán Guatemala
 Yepocapa
 Zaragoza

The department abbreviation is CMT.

References

External links
CHIMALTENANGO
Interactive department map

 
Departments of Guatemala